Hornstedtia is a genus of plants in the  Zingiberaceae. It is native to Southeast Asia, the Himalayas, southern China, New Guinea, Melanesia and Queensland.

 species

References

 
Zingiberaceae genera